The 2022 season is Albirex Niigata (S) Women's 1st season in the top flight of Singapore football.

Their marquee player is former Japan international Kana Kitahara.

Squad

Women Squad

Coaching staff

Transfer

In

Pre-season

Mid-season

Note 1: .

Loan In 
Pre-season

Loan Return 
Pre-season

Out
Pre-season

Loan Out

Friendly

Pre-season

Team statistics

Appearances and goals (Women)

Competition (Women's Premier League)

Women's Premier League

League table

References

Albirex Niigata Singapore FC
Albirex Niigata Singapore FC seasons
2023
1